The Metropolitan Archdiocese of Ouagadougou is the Metropolitan See for the Ecclesiastical province of Ouagadougou in Burkina Faso.

History
2 July 1921: Established as Apostolic Vicariate of Ouagadougou from the Apostolic Vicariate of French Sudan in Mali
14 September 1955: Promoted as Metropolitan Archdiocese of Ouagadougou

Cathedral
The seat of the archbishop is Cathédrale de l’Immaculée Conception in Ouagadougou.

Bishops

Ordinaries

 Apostolic Vicars of Ouagadougou
Joanny Thévenoud, M.Afr (8 July 1921 – 16 September 1949)
Emile-Joseph Socquet, M.Afr (16 September 1949 – 14 September 1955); see below

Archbishops of Ouagadougou
Emile-Joseph Socquet, M.Afr (14 September 1955 – 12 January 1960); see above
Paul Zoungrana, M.Afr (5 April 1960 – 10 June 1995), elevated to Cardinal in 1965
Jean-Marie Untaani Compaoré (10 June 1995 – 13 May 2009)
Philippe Ouédraogo (13 May 2009 – ), elevated to Cardinal in 2014

Coadjutor vicars apostolic
Louis-Marie-Joseph Durrieu, M. Afr. (1946-1947), did not succeed to see; appointed Superior General of Missionaries of Africa (White Fathers)
Emile-Joseph Socquet, M. Afr. (1948-1949)

Auxiliary bishops
Jean-Marie Untaani Compaoré (1973-1979), appointed Bishop of Fada N’Gourma (later returned here as Archbishop) 
Jean-Baptiste Tiendrebeogo (Kiedrebeogo) (1981-1996), appointed Bishop of Kaya
Médard Léopold Ouédraogo (2012-)

Other priest of this diocese who became bishop
Ambroise Ouédraogo, appointed Auxiliary Bishop of Niamey, Niger in 1999

Suffragan Dioceses
Koudougou
Manga
Ouahigouya

References

Sources
GCatholic.org

Ouagadougou
Ouagadougou
 
Ouagadougou